Kupchino may refer to:
Kupchino (Saint Petersburg Metro), a station of the Saint Petersburg Metro, St. Petersburg, Russia
Kupchino Municipal Okrug, a municipal okrug of Frunzensky District of the federal city of St. Petersburg, Russia